Picsart is a Miami, Florida-based technology company that develops the Picsart suite of online photo and video editing applications, with a social creative community. The platform allows users to take and edit pictures and videos, draw with layers, and share the images on Picsart and other social networks. It is one of the world's most popular apps, with reportedly more than 1 billion downloads across 180 countries.

The company was founded in 2011.

History
Picsart was founded in November 2011 by Armenian entrepreneur Hovhannes Avoyan, and Armenian programmers Artavazd Mehrabyan and Mikayel Vardanyan. Its founders developed the first Picsart application as a stand-alone tool to help people alter a photo image on their phone, and additional capabilities were added over time. The first PicsArt app launched in November 2011 on Android devices.

In January 2013, Picsart for iOS was released for the iPhone. In May, it was released for the iPad. In late 2013, Picsart photo editor became available for Windows Phone.

In January 2014, Picsart became available on devices supporting Windows 8.

By April 2015, the company reportedly had seen 250 million downloads for its iOS and Android apps, and had 60 million monthly active users.

In 2016, Picsart reached 75 million monthly active users.

In 2017, Picsart launched Remix Chat, a messaging system where users can share images directly or in groups and edit them collectively with friends. The company also launched a feature to let its user community create and share custom stickers for free. Picsart also announced that it reached 90 million monthly active users.

In July, Russian supermodel and philanthropist Natalia Vodianova joined Picsart to help increase social engagement and activism within the Picsart photo community. In October, the company reached 100 million monthly active users and began announcing partnerships with major consumer brands and celebrities.

In March 2019, Picsart reached 130 million monthly active users. Also in 2019, the company was ranked by app analytics company Sensor Tower as the #4 top grossing social photo and video editing app, after Instagram, Snapchat and YouTube.

In January 2020, the company launched an artificial intelligence lab in conjunction with the American University of Armenia. The facility employed faculty and students to conduct research in machine learning and computer vision. In July, Picsart acquired motion-based video effects company D'efekt, its first acquisition. Also in July, the company reported over 1 billion app downloads to date.

On August 26, 2021, Picsart CEO Avoyan announced that the company had raised $130 million in Series C funding from Softbank, Sequoia, G Squared, Tribe Capital, Graph Ventures and Siguler Guff & Company with a company valuation nearing $1.5 billion, making it the first tech unicorn born in Armenia.

In February 2022, Picsart acquired Code Republic, a learning platform, to be part of its education division, Picsart Academy.

Also in February, the company launched a new API program called Picsart for Developers, allowing partners to implement Picsart features on their own platforms.

In March 2022, Picsart released AI fonts, a new collection of fonts created with generative AI. 

In November 2022, Picsart added an AI Image Generator and an AI Writer to its platform, which make images and copy using generative AI. 

The company launched its AI Avatar feature in December 2022.  In January 2023, Picsart launched a new standalone app called SketchAI, which uses generative AI to turn sketches into digital art.

Products
Picsart develops mobile apps, and a set of web browser tools for editing videos and photos. The app and website tools support social networking activities.

The apps include:
Picsart Photo & Video Editor - a photo and video editing app with tools to add filters and various effects, with social network integration. The app is free to use and offers in-app purchases of stickers and other graphic elements.
Picsart Animator - an animation app allowing the creation of cartoon videos, GIFS and other animation.
Picsart Color - a drawing and painting app
Picsart GIF & Sticker Maker - an animated GIF and sticker generator
SketchAI - an app that turns drawings and photos into digital art using generative AI 

The apps are available on iOS, Android, and Windows mobile devices.

Picsart's web browser tools for PCs have the same features as the Picsart Photo & Video app, but are designed for web browsers on PCs running Windows 8.1 or higher.

Built-in social networking features with the apps and website tools allow users to comment, favorite, and follow others using the tools.

Operations
Picsart is headquartered in Miami, Florida. The company has additional offices in Yerevan, Armenia; Beijing; Moscow; Tokyo; Los Angeles; Glasgow, Scotland; and Bangalore, India. In March 2019, the company reported that 70 percent of its then 360 employees worked in engineering and product development, and half of those employees were female.

Funding
As of August 2021, the company had received $195 million in cumulative venture funding from Sequoia Capital, Insight Partners, and others, giving it a reported post-money valuation of roughly $1.5 billion.

See also 
 VSCO
 Prequel
 Animaker

References

2011 software
Android (operating system) software
IOS software
Photo software
Universal Windows Platform apps